Summer Love is a 1958 black-and-white American musical comedy film directed by Charles F. Haas, written by William Raynor and Herbert H. Margolis, and starred John Saxon, Jill St. John, Judi Meredith, and Molly Bee. It was double billed with The Big Beat and is a sequel to the 1956 film Rock, Pretty Baby.

Plot
Jimmy Daley and his bandmates, Mike and Ox, land a performing date in Lake Tahoe, California. His father, a doctor, gives his approval, although he is concerned about Jimmy neglecting his education for music. Joan Wright, his girlfriend, is sorry to see Jimmy leave, but he gives her a bus ticket and invites her to come visit.

To their surprise, Jimmy and Mike discover that Ox has booked the band at a summer camp where the musicians are also expected to work. The band is joined on stage by Alice, a very good singer, while Mike cheers up even more at the sight of beautiful girls in the audience, in particular Erica Landis, whose many admirers accompany her.

Jimmy's in for more surprises. His parents show up, on vacation, bringing along kid sister Twinkie, who's just 14 but eager to begin meeting boys. Joan also arrives, in time to jealously see Erica making a play for Jimmy. Equally envious is Mike, who is head over heels in love with Erica.

Ox falls for Alice, the singer. Twinkie gets a crush on a teenaged horse trainer. As for Jimmy, who has been resisting Erica's aggressive advances, he finally shows an interest in her, whereupon Erica cools off, having made another conquest. Jimmy and Joan patch things up, and the Daleys return home from their summer adventure.

Cast
 John Saxon as Jimmy Daley
 Molly Bee as Alice
 Rod McKuen as Ox Bentley
 Judi Meredith as Joan Wright
 Jill St. John as Erica Landis
 John Wilder as Mike Howard
 George Winslow as Thomas Daley III
 Fay Wray as Beth Daley
 Edward Platt as Thomas Daley
 Shelley Fabares as Twinkie
 Gordon Gebert Tad Powers
 Beverly Washburn as Jackie Bronson
 Bob Courtney as Half-Note Harris
 Hylton Socher as Fingers Porter
 Marjorie Durant as Hilda
 Walter Reed as Mr. Reid

Production
In May 1957 Universal announced they would make a sequel to Rock Pretty Baby with John Saxon and several of the original cast, though not Sal Mineo who was "too busy".

Reception
It is rated 6.5/10 on the IMDb and 2.5/5 on AllMovie.

Home media
Universal has not officially released Summer Love on DVD or VHS. A few bootleg DVD-R copies of varying quality exist but otherwise, not much else is known.

References

External links
 
 
 

1958 films
1958 musical comedy films
American black-and-white films
American musical comedy films
American sequel films
Films directed by Charles F. Haas
Films scored by Henry Mancini
Films about summer camps
Universal Pictures films
1950s English-language films
1950s American films